In the self-blended model of learning (or self-blend model of learning), students take online courses in addition to their traditional face-to-face learning. This model of blended learning is commonly practiced among American high school students, and students follow this approach because it gives them the freedom to supplement what they have learned and what they have been taught in class.
The self-blended model of learning is generally approached by the students opting to take online courses outside of the time they spend on the traditional courses. It tackles the problem of the courses or subjects which are not provided by the school due to various reasons such as lack of funding, lack of student interest or lack of time. Students take online courses either in a brick-and-mortar campus or offsite. It is not necessary to have computers at home for the students who use the self-blended model of learning, as they can access the internet at their own school computer labs or they can head to local libraries to complete their work. They can also go to nearby cyber lounges.

Use 
The self-blend learning model is often used by high school students, as it requires students to monitor their learning process and take initiatives, which the younger students may have difficulty managing. Therefore, it differs in this way from the rotational model of learning which is quite often used in elementary schools, whereas many high school students are taking additional math, English and social studies courses online in addition to their courses offered at school.

Advantages 
There are a number of advantages to the self-blend model of learning:
It is very helpful for dropout students to recover, earn college/AP credit or to recover credits.
It not only enhances the classroom learning but it also provides access to the online course which are otherwise not offered in the school due to various reasons, such as lack of funds, time and resources.
In addition to the access to the online courses, it also enhances the digital literacy of the students, useful for students entering a 21st century workforce.
Taking online courses is more affordable for the students.
It provides opportunities to take up specialized courses, like college preparatory skill and life skills courses.
It can be used for professional development as well as for instructional purposes.

Disadvantages 
The main disadvantage of the self-blend model is that the students will not receive face to face instruction for that particular course.
It also involves a lack of formal structure for the undisciplined and unmotivated students.

See also
21st century skills
Distance learning
Pedagogy
Personalized learning
Rotation model of learning

References 

Educational practices